Stordalen Chapel is a parish church of the Church of Norway in Meråker municipality in Trøndelag county, Norway. It is located in the village of Stordalen. It is one of the three churches in the Meråker parish which is part of the Stjørdal prosti (deanery) in the Diocese of Nidaros. The white and yellow, wooden church was built in a long church style in 1863 by the architect Jacob Wilhelm Nordan. The church seats about 130 people.

History
A Royal Decree on 28 October 1861 granted permission for the parish to build a chapel on Stordalen in Meråker for the people who lived in the Stordalen and Teveldalen valleys along the border with Sweden. The chapel was designed by Jacob Wilhelm Nordan. The lead builder for the construction was Gunnar Hågensen Gresset from Hegra. Stordalen Chapel was consecrated on 22 July 1863.

See also
List of churches in Nidaros

References

Meråker
Churches in Trøndelag
Long churches in Norway
Wooden churches in Norway
19th-century Church of Norway church buildings
Churches completed in 1863
1863 establishments in Norway